Bahra may refer to:

Bahra, Hama, a village in Syria
Bahra (newspaper), a Baghdad-based newspaper
Bahra (river), a river of the Czech Republic and of Saxony, Germany
Jabal Bahra, name of the Syrian Coastal Mountain Range in the medieval period
Bahra', an ancient Arab tribe in Syria
Bahra ceremony, a girl's coming of age ritual in Newar community of Nepal
Bahra Biscuit Factory in Baku, Azerbaijan

People with that surname

 Hadi al-Bahra (born 1959), member of the Syrian opposition movement